Kenneth Williams (4 January 1882 – 25 March 1920) was a New Zealand cricketer. He played in three first-class matches for Canterbury from 1906 to 1914.

See also
 List of Canterbury representative cricketers

References

External links
 

1882 births
1920 deaths
New Zealand cricketers
Canterbury cricketers
Cricketers from Christchurch